The Best Music Supervision for Films Budgeted Over $25 Million award is annually given by the Guild of Music Supervisors to honor the best music supervision in a film with a budget over $25 million. It was first given at their third annual awards function, and has continued since then. In 2014, the Award was re-titled Best Music Supervision for Films Over $35 million, but reverted to its original name the following year.

Winners and nominees

2010s

References

American film awards
Film awards for Best Music Director